Donald James Mackay, 11th Lord Reay,  (22 December 1839 – 1 August 1921), in the Netherlands known as Donald Jacob, Baron Mackay, Lord of Ophemert and Zennewijnen, was a Dutch-born British administrator and Liberal politician.

Background
Mackay was born Donald Jacob baron Mackay in The Hague, Netherlands, the son of Aeneas Mackay, 10th Lord Reay, a Dutch member of Parliament, and jonkvrouw Maria Catharina Anna Jacoba Fagel, daughter of mr. Jacob baron Fagel and jkvr. Maria Boreel, relative of the Boreel baronets.

Political career
Lord Reay succeeded his father in 1876 and was naturalised as a British subject in 1877. He was created Baron Reay, of Durness in the County of Sutherland, in the Peerage of the United Kingdom, in 1881. In 1885 he was appointed Governor of Bombay, a post he held until 1890. He was appointed a Knight Grand Commander of the Most Eminent Order of the Indian Empire in 1887 and a Knight Grand Commander of the Most Exalted Order of the Star of India in 1890. After his return to Britain he served as Under-Secretary of State for India between 1894 and 1895 in Lord Rosebery Liberal administration. He was also a British delegate at the Second Peace Conference which led to the signing of the Hague Convention 1907. Other British delegates included Ernest Satow and Eyre Crowe. 

Perhaps his most memorable contribution to politics was during the crisis over the People's Budget of 1909–10, where the House of Lords, violating a convention going back more than 200 years, rejected the Budget. Reay strongly opposed this act, and gave the memorable warning: "Oligarchies are seldom destroyed and more frequently commit suicide".

Other public appointments
Apart from his political and administrative career Lord Reay was Rector of St Andrews University from 1884 to 1886, Chairman of the London School Board (1897–1904), President of the Royal Asiatic Society (1893–1921) and University College, London, and the first President of the British Academy from 1902 to 1907. He was also Lord Lieutenant of Roxburghshire from 1892 to 1918 and served as President of the first day of the 1882 Co-operative Congress. He was sworn of the Privy Council in 1906 and made a Knight of the Thistle in 1911.

He received an honorary doctorate (LL.D) from the University of Glasgow during their 450th jubilee celebrations in June 1901.

He remained in contact with the Dutch community and attended the reception and spoke with the famous Dutch writer Louis Couperus (1863–1923) on the occasion of his visit to London in June 1921, being invited by the Dutch ambassador in London, René de Marees van Swinderen (1860–1955), and which visit was mainly organised by his translator Alexander Teixeira de Mattos (1865–1921).

Family

Lord Reay married Fanny Georgiana Jane, daughter of Richard Hasler, of Aldingbourne, Sussex, in 1877. They had no children. He died in August 1921, aged 81. On his death the barony of 1881 became extinct while he was succeeded in the Scottish title by his cousin Eric baron Mackay (1870–1921) who was succeeded only three months later by his son Sir Aeneas Alexander baron Mackay (1905–1963), 13th Lord Reay, member of the House of Lords (1955–1959).

References

External links
Photograph of Lord Reay at the National Portrait Gallery
 Papers of Lord Reay from his time as Governor of Bombay [Mumbai] are held at https://www.soas.ac.uk/library/archives/collections/a-z/r/.

1839 births
1921 deaths
Academics of University College London
Mackay, Donald
Mackay, Donald
Dutch people of Scottish descent
Governors of Bombay
Knights Grand Commander of the Order of the Star of India
Knights Grand Commander of the Order of the Indian Empire
Knights of the Thistle
Lord-Lieutenants of Roxburghshire
Members of the London School Board
Members of the Privy Council of the United Kingdom
Delegates to the Hague Peace Conferences
Presidents of Co-operative Congress
Presidents of the British Academy
Rectors of the University of St Andrews
Administrators in British India
Presidents of the Royal Asiatic Society
Members of the Bombay Legislative Council
Fellows of the British Academy
Scottish justices of the peace
Lords Reay
Peers of the United Kingdom created by Queen Victoria
Deputy Lieutenants